"Good Lovin" is a song by American rapper Ludacris, featuring vocals from American singer Miguel. The song was released December 15, 2014 as the first single from Burning Bridges EP and later Ludaversal. The track was produced by Da Internz.

Background
The track premiered online October 31, 2014 before its official release on Google Play and later, iTunes.

Charts

Certifications

References

2014 songs
2014 singles
Ludacris songs
Miguel (singer) songs
Def Jam Recordings singles
Songs written by Ludacris
Song recordings produced by Da Internz
Songs written by Miguel (singer)